Baron Glanusk, of Glanusk Park in the County of Brecknock, is a title in the Peerage of the United Kingdom. It was created in 1899 for Sir Joseph Bailey, 2nd Baronet, who had earlier represented Herefordshire and Hereford in the House of Commons as a Conservative. Both his son, the second Baron, and grandson, the third Baron, served as Lord Lieutenant of Brecknockshire. The latter was succeeded by his first cousin, the fourth Baron. He was the son of the Hon. Herbert Crawshay Bailey, fourth son of the first Baron.  the titles are held by his son, the fifth Baron, who succeeded in 1997.

The Bailey baronetcy, of Glanusk Park in the County of Brecon, was created in the Baronetage of the United Kingdom in 1852 for Joseph Bailey, an English ironmaster and Member of Parliament for Worcester and Breconshire. He was succeeded by his grandson, the aforementioned second Baronet, who was elevated to the peerage in 1899.

The family residence of the Bailey family was Glanusk Park, which was left by the 3rd Baron Glanusk in 1948 to his daughter Dame Elizabeth Shân Legge-Bourke DCVO, Lord Lieutenant of Powys.

Bailey baronets, of Glanusk Park (1852)
Sir Joseph Bailey, 1st Baronet (1783–1858)
Joseph Bailey (1812–1850)
Sir Joseph Russell Bailey, 2nd Baronet (1840–1906) (created Baron Glanusk in 1899)

Baron Glanusk (1899)
Joseph Russell Bailey, 1st Baron Glanusk (1840–1906)
Joseph Henry Russell Bailey, 2nd Baron Glanusk (1864–1928)
Wilfred Russell Bailey, 3rd Baron Glanusk (1891–1948)
David Russell Bailey, 4th Baron Glanusk (1917–1997)
Christopher Russell Bailey, 5th Baron Glanusk (born 1942)

The heir apparent is the present holder's son, Hon. Charles Henry Bailey (born 1976).

Male-line family tree

Coat of arms

Notes

References

≈Official History; "Naval Operations" by Sir Julian S. Corbett. 1923

External links
The family home of the Barons Glanusk

Baronies in the Peerage of the United Kingdom
Noble titles created in 1899
Noble titles created for UK MPs